Murvica may refer to:
 Murvica, Split-Dalmatia County
 Murvica, Zadar County